is a former Japanese football player. He currently works on television as a football commentator.

Playing career
Nakanishi was born in Nagoya on 8 September 1969. After graduating from Doshisha University, he joined his local club Nagoya Grampus Eight in 1992. He played many matches as midfielder from first season. Although he could hardly play in the match in 1993, he played many matches from 1994. The club also won the champions 1995 Emperor's Cup first major title in club history. In Asia, the club won the 2nd place 1996–97 Asian Cup Winners' Cup. At the final on 26 November 1996, he scored a goal. In 1997, he moved to Japan Football League club Kawasaki Frontale. He played in all matches as defender and defensive midfielder in 1997 and 1998. In 1998, the club won the 2nd place and was promoted to J2 League. In 1999, the club won the champions and was promoted to J1 League. However he lost regular position in 2000 and retired end of 2000 season.

Private life
In March 2007, Nakanishi is married to model and actress Fumina Hara. In January 2014, he announced divorce with Hara.

Club statistics

References

External links

1969 births
Living people
Doshisha University alumni
Association football people from Aichi Prefecture
Japanese footballers
J1 League players
J2 League players
Japan Football League (1992–1998) players
Nagoya Grampus players
Kawasaki Frontale players
Association football defenders